The Peltier House is a historic house located at 403 Canal Boulevard in Thibodaux, Louisiana.

Built between 1910 and 1914, the house is a -story frame residence in Colonial Revival style. The front gallery features Ionic columns on brick bases. On the rear of the house a roughly contemporary garage is considered a contributing property.

The house was listed on the National Register of Historic Places on April 29, 1986.

It is one of 14 individually NRHP-listed properties in the "Thibodaux Multiple Resource Area", which also includes:
Bank of Lafourche Building
Breaux House
Building at 108 Green Street
Chanticleer Gift Shop
Citizens Bank of Lafourche
Grand Theatre
Lamartina Building
McCulla House

Percy-Lobdell Building
Riviere Building
Riviere House
Robichaux House
St. Joseph Co-Cathedral and Rectory

See also
 National Register of Historic Places listings in Lafourche Parish, Louisiana

References

Houses on the National Register of Historic Places in Louisiana
Colonial Revival architecture in Louisiana
Houses completed in 1910
Lafourche Parish, Louisiana
National Register of Historic Places in Lafourche Parish, Louisiana